Earl Brassey was a title in the Peerage of the United Kingdom. It was created in 1911 for the Liberal politician and former Governor of Victoria, Australia, Thomas Brassey, 1st Baron Brassey, eldest son of the railway magnate Thomas Brassey (1805-1870). He had already been created Baron Brassey, of Bulkeley in the County Palatine of Chester, in 1886, and was made Viscount Hythe, of Hythe in the County of Kent, at the same time as he was granted the earldom. These titles were also in the Peerage of the United Kingdom. The titles became extinct upon the death of his son, the second Earl, in 1919.

Henry Brassey, 1st Baron Brassey of Apethorpe was the nephew of the first Earl.

Earls Brassey (1911)
Thomas Brassey, 1st Earl Brassey (1836–1918)
Thomas Allnutt Brassey, 2nd Earl Brassey (1863–1919)

See also
Baron Brassey of Apethorpe

References

Extinct earldoms in the Peerage of the United Kingdom
Earl
Noble titles created in 1911
Noble titles created for UK MPs